Ruth is a 1956 sacred opera in English by Lennox Berkeley to a libretto by Eric Crozier after the Old Testament Book of Ruth.  Premiered at the Scala Theatre, London.

Recording
Ruth, Jean Rigby (mezzo-soprano), Mark Tucker (tenor), Yvonne Kenny (soprano), Claire Rutter (soprano), Roderick Williams (baritone) Joyful Company of Singers, City of London Sinfonia, Richard Hickox Chandos

References

Operas
1956 operas
Operas by Lennox Berkeley